Heather Rose Butler  (born 6 November 1947) is a former Australian politician. Born in Hampton in Melbourne, Victoria, she was elected to the Tasmanian House of Assembly as a Labor member for Lyons in 2005 in a recount caused by the resignation of Ken Bacon. She was defeated in 2010.

In 2005 Butler was inducted to the Tasmanian Honour Roll of Women for service to tourism and to the community.

Butler had previously been awarded the Medal of the Order of Australia before she was advanced to a Member of the Order of Australia in the 2012 Queen's birthday honours.

References

1947 births
Living people
Members of the Tasmanian House of Assembly
Members of the Order of Australia
Australian Labor Party members of the Parliament of Tasmania
University of Melbourne alumni
21st-century Australian politicians
21st-century Australian women politicians
University of Melbourne women
Women members of the Tasmanian House of Assembly
People from Hampton, Victoria
Politicians from Melbourne
Australian schoolteachers